Facets Multi-Media founded in 1975, is a non-profit, 501(C)3 organization, and a leading national media arts organization. Its mission is to preserve, present, distribute, and educate about film. Besides its facilities at 1517 W. Fullerton Ave., Chicago, Illinois, Facets Multi-Media also runs Facets Video, one of the largest distributors of foreign film in the United States. Facets has been described as a “temple of great cinema” by film critic Roger Ebert and "a giant in the rarefied world of art-house films and cultural education."

Facilities
Facets maintains facilities in Chicago, where it was founded by Milos Stehlik as a non-profit film organization. The brick-and-mortar space includes a single-screen movie theater (referred to as Facets Cinémathèque), which screens "interesting" independent films and "obscure" features not shown anywhere else around Chicago. It also houses a video rental store with over 65,000 titles, described as "a stunningly deep archive of every kind of experimental, avant-garde, foreign and children's film you could hope to find." There is also a non-accredited film school, consisting of classes for the general public. Since the earliest days of home video, customers around the U.S. have been able to rent videos from Facets's "pioneering home-delivery rental system."

Programs
Facets runs the annual Chicago International Children's Film Festival, a Kids Film Camp for ages 7–14, Facets Film School for Chicago-area cinephiles, Facets Night School for cult film connoisseurs, and a Summer Film Institute for K-12 teachers.

Facets Video
Facets is a nationally-recognized conservator, publisher and distributor of films on DVD, including independent, art-house, classics, documentaries, and experimental films. Facets has distributed films by renowned directors such as Bela Tarr, Jean-Luc Godard, Miloš Forman, Věra Chytilová, Amos Gitai, Alexander Kluge, Andrzej Zulawski, and Miklós Jancsó. Notable films released by Facets include Dekalog, Heimat, Satantango, Medea, Hamlet, Germany in Autumn, La Bataille du Rail, Germany, Pale Mother, Valerie and Her Week of Wonders, The Steamroller and the Violin, Christ Stopped at Eboli, Keep Walking, Love, The Joke, Three Wishes for Cinderella, Three Brothers, Total Balalaika Show, The House Is Black, The Fifth Horseman Is Fear, Voyage in Time, Kamikaze Hearts, and The Murder of Fred Hampton. Since the late 1980s, Facets has released over 800 films on VHS and DVD.

References

External links 
 

Film archives in the United Kingdom
Film organizations in the United States
Cinemas and movie theaters in Chicago
Film distributors of the United States
Arts organizations established in 1975
1975 establishments in Illinois